USS Grampus was a schooner in the United States Navy. She was the first U.S. Navy ship to be named for the Grampus griseus, also known as Risso's dolphin.

Grampus was built at the Washington Navy Yard under the supervision of naval constructor William Doughty, based on a design by Henry Eckford. Her  keel was laid down in 1820. She was launched in early August 1821. The need to suppress piracy and to maintain ships to catch slavers led to the building of five such schooners, the largest of which was Grampus. This was the first building program undertaken by the Navy since the War of 1812.

Service history
Lieutenant Francis Gregory commanded Grampus on her first cruise as part of the West Indies Squadron, which took her to the Antilles in pursuit of pirates.

On 16 August 1822, Grampus fought a brig flying Spanish colors, but which Lt. Gregory suspected was a pirate. When he called upon her commander to surrender, he was met with cannon and small arms fire. Grampus answered in turn, and reduced the bogus Spaniard to a floating wreck in  minutes. The brig struck her colors and Lt. Gregory discovered that she was Palmyra, a Puerto Rico-based pirate carrying the papers of a privateer as a subterfuge. Lloyd's List named the privateer as Panchetta, of 18 guns and 92 men. The privateer had suffered 11 men killed.

In 1825, Captain John D. Sloat — commander of Grampus — engaged another Puerto Rican pirate, Roberto Cofresí, in battle. Cofresí was captured along with eleven members of his crew, and they were turned over to the Spanish government. Cofresí was jailed in El Castillo del Morro in San Juan.

Grampus had a small part in the Amistad trials: in November–December 1839, the U.S. government had Grampus standing by in New Haven Harbor, so that if the court ruled in favor of the slaves' Spanish "owners," they could deport the Africans to Cuba before they could file an appeal. However, the district judge ruled that the Africans had been illegally enslaved and must be returned to Africa. It was the government that appealed on behalf of the slaveholders, and Grampus was not needed.

Grampus continued her duties in the protection of shipping in the Caribbean Sea and in the South Atlantic Ocean until August 1841, when she was detached from the Africa Squadron while lying at Boston Navy Yard and attached to the Home Squadron at Norfolk, Virginia on 23 January 1843.

She is presumed to have foundered in a gale off Charleston, South Carolina with all hands.

Fictional namesake

Author Herman Melville created a fictional whaling ship in his novel Moby-Dick by the name of "Grampus", its crew briefly mentioned in Chapter 3 as they enter the Spouter Inn after a three years voyage. The enigmatic character of Bulkington disappears from the Spouter Inn in the midst of the "Grampus" crew's revelries, his shipmates pursuing him into the night with cries of "Where's Bulkington?" Later in the book Bulkington turns up as a crewman on board the Pequod, the narrator Ishmael noting it would be Bulkington's fate to die at sea, but never mentioning him again in the book.

References

Schooners of the United States Navy
Ships built in the District of Columbia
Shipwrecks of the Carolina coast
Missing ships
Individual sailing vessels
1821 ships
Maritime incidents in March 1843
Ships lost with all hands
Maritime incidents in August 1822